Abacetus inopinus is a species of ground beetle in the Pterostichinae subfamily. It was described by Peringuey in 1904.

References

inopinus
Beetles described in 1904